Tychozorente is the sixteenth studio album by Omar Rodríguez-López. The digital version was released on September 14, 2010, and the CD was released by Rodriguez Lopez Productions in Europe on November 18, 2010. This record is Omar's first collaboration with DJ Nobody and his first release to feature no guitar. Two songs, "Polaridad" and "El Todo" were premiered during a performance by Omar Rodriguez Lopez Group at Metamorphose Festival, Japan, on September 4, 2010. An official video directed by Omar for "Polaridad" was released the day following the album's digital release.

Track listing

Personnel
 Ximena Sariñana Rivera – vocals, lyrics
 Omar Rodríguez-López – sequencers, programming, synths, xylophone, voice
 Marcel Rodriguez-Lopez – Mellotron
 Elvin Estela – programming, additional production, bass

Release history

References

External links
 

2010 albums
Omar Rodríguez-López albums
Albums produced by Omar Rodríguez-López